The Wrestling competition at the 2010 Central American and Caribbean Games was held in Mayagüez, Puerto Rico. 

The tournament was scheduled to be held from 23–27 July at the Aguada Coliseum at Porta del Sol.

Medal summary

Men's events

Women's events

External links

Events at the 2010 Central American and Caribbean Games
July 2010 sports events in North America
2010 in sport wrestling
Wrestling at the Central American and Caribbean Games